Acanothopathes is a genus of coral in the family Aphanipathidae that contains five species. Species in this genus are found in the Caribbean Sea, Indian Ocean, and Pacific Ocean in temperatures ranging from about 10 to 30 degrees celsius at depths from 50 to 400 meters.

References

Aphanipathidae
Cnidarians of the Caribbean Sea
Cnidarians of the Indian Ocean
Cnidarians of the Pacific Ocean
Marine fauna of Asia
Marine fauna of Oceania
Marine fauna of North America
Marine fauna of South America
Marine fauna of Southeast Asia
Hexacorallia genera